The Independent International Commission of Inquiry in Ukraine is a United Nations commission of inquiry established by the United Nations Human Rights Council on 4 March 2022 with a mandate to investigate violations of human rights and of international humanitarian law in the 2022 Russian invasion of Ukraine. The Commission delivered its reports on 18 October 2022 and 16 March 2023.

Creation
On 3 March 2022, the United Nations Human Rights Council (UNHRC) started debating the effect of the 2022 Russian invasion of Ukraine on human rights. On 4 March, in resolution A/HRC/49/L.1, the UNHRC condemned the violations of human rights and international law caused by the full-scale Russian invasion, called for Russia to stop its violations in Ukraine, called for Russia to completely withdraw from internationally recognised Ukrainian territory in order to prevent further violations, and decided to establish an independent international commission of inquiry on Ukraine. The resolution was passed by the UNHRC with 32 states in favour, 13 absentions and 2 (Eritrea and Russia) against.

The Russian representative on the UNHRC, Evgeny Ustinov, viewed the commission of inquiry as "a mere waste of resources, which could better be used to help civilians in Ukraine". Human Rights Watch expressed its support for the UNHRC to create a commission of inquiry into violations of human rights and international humanitarian law in Ukraine by all groups involved.

Structure
The commission of inquiry was initially set up to include three human rights experts, initially for one year, headed by Erik Møse from Norway, and also including Jasminka Džumhur from Bosnia and Herzegovina and Pablo de Greiff from Colombia.

Aims
The aim of the commission of inquiry is to investigate all alleged violations and abuses of human rights and international humanitarian law in the context of the 2022 Russian invasion of Ukraine. The commission is required to make recommendations based on its investigation, initially reporting in September 2022 to the fifty-first and fifty-second sessions of the UNHRC and the seventy-seventh session of the United Nations General Assembly.

Report 
On 18 October 2022, the Commission published its report on events that took place between the end of February and March 2022 in the four regions of Kyiv, Chernihiv, Kharkiv, and Sumy.The Commission found that Russian armed forces were responsible for the large majority of violations of human rights and international humanitarian law, and that Ukrainian forces also committed violations of international humanitarian law, including two incidents that qualified as war crimes.

See also
 Allegations of genocide of Ukrainians in the 2022 Russian invasion of Ukraine
 International Criminal Court investigation in Ukraine
 Legality of the 2022 Russian invasion of Ukraine
 Ukraine v. Russian Federation (2022)
 United Nations Human Rights Monitoring Mission in Ukraine

References

External links
Independent International Commission of Inquiry on Ukraine

Human rights in Ukraine
War crimes during the 2022 Russian invasion of Ukraine
Ukraine
Ukraine
Ukraine and the United Nations
Russia and the United Nations
2022 in the United Nations